Alex Brady Epton, known professionally as XXXChange (formerly known as XXXCBIOSCCC), is an American, New York-based record producer, mixer and film composer. In 2014, he joined XL Recordings in New York, and as their in-house producer/engineer worked with FKA Twigs, Wiki, Ratking, Amber Mark, Jamie xx, Willis Earl Beal, Vampire Weekend and Skepta.ZXCVBNM 

In addition to his work as a record producer, Epton has scored several television commercials and short films including GANG directed by Clayton Vomero, and Juvenile directed by Jovan Todorovic.

He produced the 2006 debut album YoYoYoYoYo of the musical group Spank Rock. He was also involved with the self-titled debut album of the group WIN WIN alongside Chris Devlin and Ghostdad, released in 2011 on Vice Records.

Epton has also done production or remix work for The Kills, Kele Okereke, Björk, Charlotte Gainsbourg, Thom Yorke, TV on the Radio, Lily Allen, Kool Keith, and Kylie Minogue.

As a DJ, Epton performed at the V Festival in the UK and Parklife Festival in Australia 2008, Sonar Festival in Spain and the Guggenheim in NYC 2009, Electric Zoo Festival in NYC & Ninja Tune XX in London 2010.

Discography

2006and
Spank Rock – YoYoYoYoYo
"Backyard Betty"
"What It Look Like"
"IMC"
"Rick Rubin"
"Touch Me"
"Bump"
"Sweet Talk"
"Chilly Will"
"Top Billin' from Far Left"
"Coke & Wet"
"Competition"
"Outro (Screwville USA)"

2008
The Kills – Midnight Boom
"Cheap and Cheerful"
"Black Balloon"
"M.E.X.I.C.O."
"What New York Used to Be"

2009
Amanda Blank – I Love You
"Make It Take It"
"Make-Up"
"Shame on Me"
"Might Like You Better"
Kid Sister – Ultraviolet
"Let Me Bang 2009"
"54321"
"Get Fresh"
"Control"

2010
Kele – The Boxer
"Walk Tall"
"On the Lam"
"Tenderoni"
"The Other Side"
"Everything You Wanted"
"The New Rules"
"Unholy Thoughts"
"Rise"
"All the Things I Could Never Say"
"Yesterday's Gone"
"Meet in the Middle" (digital bonus track)

2011
Kele – The Hunter
"What Did I Do?" (featuring Lucy Taylor)
"Devotion"
"Love as a Weapon"
"You Belong to Someone Else"
WIN WIN – WIN WIN
"Victim" (featuring Blaqstarr)
"Future Again (Oakland) (featuring Angela Sarakan)
"Releaserpm" (featuring Lizzi Bougatsos)
"Interleave"(featuring Alexis Taylor)
"Cada Buen Dia"
"Pop A Gumball" (featuring Andrew W.K., Matt Sweeney, and Naeem Hanks)
"Distorted Reality 3"
"Ghosts/Delirium"
"The Nature of Transcendent Forces" (featuring Douglas Armour)
"Not Too Late"
"Not Too Late (Pt. 2)"  (featuring Mika Yoneta)
GANG GANG DANCE – Eye Contact 
Michel Poicard – The Death Set

2012
WIN WIN – Double Vision 
Peaches – Burst!

2013
Willis Earl Beal – Nobody Knows.

2014
Ratking – So it Goes

2015
Kali Uchis – Por Vida
”Melting”
”Lottery”
Larry Gus – I Need New Eyes 
Neon Indian – Vega Intl. Night School 
WIN WIN – Primaries

2016
Prince Rama – Xtreme Now

2017
MIKE – May God Bless Your Hustle
Wiki – No Mountains in Manhattan

2018
David Byrne – American Utopia 
HAWA – Might Be

2019
FKA Twigs – Magdalene 
Wiki – Oofie 
Jack Penate – Prayer 
Holy Ghost! – Work 
MIKE – Tears of Joy

Official remixes

2006
Kool Keith/Dr. Octagon – "Trees (SpankRock remix)"

2008
Kenna - Out of Control (XXXChange Remix) (Exclusively featured in Facebreaker and MLB 08 The Show)
Björk – "Earth Intruders (xxxchange remix)"
Beck – "Nausea (XXXchange remix)"
Panda Bear – "Comfy in Nautica (XXXChange remix)"
Santogold – "L.E.S. Artistes (XXXChange mix)"
Gang Gang Dance – "House Jam (XXXChange remix)"

2009
El Guincho – "Antillas (XXXChangxxe remix)"

2010
Kylie Minogue – "All the Lovers (XXXChangeRemix)"
Yeasayer – "O.N.E. (XXXChange Remix)"
Thom Yorke – "The Eraser (XXXchange Remix)"
Charlotte Gainsbourg – "Time of the Assassins (XXXChange Remix)"

2011
TV on the Radio – "Will Do (XXXChange Remix)"

2013
Vampire Weekend - "Step (XXXChange Remix)"

References

External links
Official website

Living people
Club DJs
Record producers from New York (state)
American electronic musicians
American DJs
Remixers
American hip hop record producers
Musicians from Baltimore
Musicians from New York (state)
Year of birth missing (living people)
Electronic dance music DJs